Aldebrandin of Siena (died 1296/1299?) was an Italian physician known for his 1256 sanitation guidebook Le Régime du corps. He lived in Siena and Troyes.

References 

Year of birth unknown
1290s deaths
Italian medical writers
Italian writers in French
People from Siena